The Blackshear Times is an American weekly newspaper founded in 1889 and published in Blackshear, Georgia. The Times is a community newspaper, thus its coverage is primarily centered on the events in Pierce County, Georgia. The current owner and publisher of The Times is Matthew F. Gardner. The Papers' motto, as printed in the top-center of the front page, is "Liked by Many, Cussed by Some, Read by Them All."

History

The name of weekly newspaper has been The Blackshear Times since October 10, 1889.

Exactly who came up with the name is not known, although E.Z. Byrd stated in an editorial on April 17, 1902, that "we presume it was Mr. B.D. Brantley, our present treasurer, who gave The Times its name." The paper was being published by The Times Publishing Company. It was owned by The A.P. Brantley Company.

On March 2, 1911 E.Z. Byrd, who had been owner of, or with, the county newspaper for 23 years, announced that he was selling The Times to Col. C.A. Sydnor.

The Times would have eight owners over the next 15 years. Owners following Sydnor included H. (Harry) Johnsen, partners W.L. Knight and R.D. Thomas, W. Boyce Bailey, partners F.X. Ebner and G.M. Shepard, Jack Williams, W. Kirk Sutlive and Carl Broome.

Carl Broome eventually sold the newspaper to sons Lee and Dean Broome. Dean became sole owner of The Times in 1958, after having managed and edited the paper for 12 years under his father and as co-owner and editor with his brother, Lee. Little change would occur in the operation after the takeover. On March 5, 1970, Dean Broome sold The Blackshear Times to Donald L. Ferrell.

When Ferrell bought the newspaper, he was one of the triad known as the Pierce County Publishing Company. His partners were Roy Chalker Sr. and Wilkes Williams. Ferrell was president of the company.

Robert M. Williams Jr. bought into Blackshear Times and Pierce County Publishing Company April 15, 1971, at age 20 and became editor and publisher. In March 1976, Williams became sole editor and publisher when he bought out partners Roy Chalker Sr. and Wilkes Williams.

Williams moved The Times into a building previously known as Oak View Pharmacy, located on the corner of Gordon Street and Carter Avenue. The building was constructed by the late Quinton Boyette as a pharmacy building for Kenneth and Katherine Henley. The Henleys purchased the land from the late Mack Carter.

Current Ownership

Current editor and publisher Matthew F. Gardner bought the Blackshear Times and on July 1, 2019 at the age of 35.

The Times currently uses a computerized newsroom to produce its products.

The newspaper operation moved to downtown Blackshear on SW Central Avenue in 2003 and relocated two doors down to its current 121 SW Central Ave. location in September 2012. The Times is centered between Main Street and Taylor Street, facing railroad tracks running through the heart of the city.

Journalistic Awards
The Blackshear Times has won over 360 awards total from the Georgia Press Association and National Newspaper Association during Williams' tenure as publisher.

Associated Newspapers
MC Gardner Publishing, Inc. publishes The Blackshear Times.

References

External links
Official Website
Official Facebook Page
Official Twitter Page

Pierce County, Georgia
Newspapers established in 1889
Weekly newspapers published in the United States
Newspapers published in Georgia (U.S. state)
1889 establishments in Georgia (U.S. state)